The Gorge is a closed railway station on the Broken Hill railway line in New South Wales, Australia. The station opened in 1919 and closed in 1971.

References

Disused regional railway stations in New South Wales
Railway stations in Australia opened in 1919
Railway stations closed in 1971